Basic Academy of International Studies also known as Basic Academy and Basic High School, is a public high school with an embedded magnet high school that is part of the Clark County School District. It was the first high school in Henderson, Nevada, United States.

School name
During the World War II era, numerous factories located themselves in the Las Vegas Valley. Chief among these was Basic Magnesium Plant (BMI) which was created for the war effort. BMI’s “miracle metal” allowed airplanes to be more lightweight and bombs to be more powerful. A new town was created to accommodate associated magnesium workers.

While the military installation was officially titled secret codename Plancor 201H, the federal government called it Midway City. Unofficially, it was known as Basic Townsite. In 1942, the name of the city was changed to Henderson in honor of famed Nevadan and U.S. Sen. Charles Belknap Henderson who was also a Lieutenant in the Rough Rider Cavalry during the Spanish-American War.

As magnesium workers relocated to Henderson, a new high school was needed for their children, and Townsite High School was created. Its name was soon changed to Railroad Pass High School, and so it remained until 1945 when the city was listed as a military surplus. Since this time, the school has been commonly known as Basic High School—though as is a theme throughout its history—Basic is also known by other names, most notably Basic Academy of International Studies.

History and traditions
Basic High School opened in 1942. The school, then located where the Henderson City Hall now stands, graduated its first class of ten students in 1943. In 1954 it moved to a site near Van Wagenen Street and Pacific Avenue (the current site of Lyal Burkholder Middle School). Since 1973 Basic High School has been located at 400 N. Palo Verde Drive.

The school received IB accreditation for the Middle Years Programme in 2016 and the Diploma Programme in 2017.

Until the opening of Green Valley High School, Basic was the only high school in Henderson. A long-standing rivalry exists between the two. A large white "B" is painted on a local mountain during the week of Homecoming, which stands for "Basic"; it is visible throughout the entire city of Henderson year-long. The original "B" was painted near the old Basic High School on Black Mountain, now known as Lyal Burkholder Middle School, which was also maintained for many years, long after Basic relocated to its current campus.

School features
A three-story building is very noticeable on the Basic Academy of International Studies campus; most classrooms here are classes for freshmen students, and it is referred to as the "Towers" since it towers over the rest of the school.

An International Baccalaureate Program is offered at Basic Academy.

Basic is one of the few schools in Henderson which still has an annual Homecoming parade.

Clubs and organizations
The school offers many clubs, including a chess club, Bible club, Super Smash Bros. club, Polynesian club, Key Club, and Spanish Club. It is one of the few high schools in the county to have a robotics club, which builds and designs high-tech robots and enters them at annual competitions at UNLV.

Led by coach Richard Walters, the Robotics Club was home to the most successful teams in Nevada robotics history, including teams 9922Z (state champs 2018, 2019, 2020, and national finalists in 2019), 9922X (state champs in 2019), 9922A (state champs in 2018), and 9922C (state champs in 2017). During the 2022 season they finished a combined 4 - 8 in just two tournaments.

Basic's El Lobo yearbook is set to high standards, and has won national praise for many years.  The 2005 El Lobo Volume LXIII (63rd) yearbook was named the silver medalist by the CSPA and was named All-American with four marks of distinction for the 16th consecutive year. The yearbook is published by Herff Jones publishing company.

The Lone Wolf Newspaper of Basic Academy of International Studies is the oldest newspaper in Henderson.  The 2008–2009 school year was its 66th year of publication.  It has been published longer than the prominent Las Vegas Sun newspaper, owned by Greenspun Media and founded in 1950. In 2009 the Lone Wolf won second Place in the 33rd annual Las Vegas Review-Journal High School Journalism awards in the "Reduced" format for best high school newspaper.

Representatives from their thespian troop competed at the State Thespian Conference in 2010 and won first place in their category of "Group Musical," with their performance of "Your Fault/Last Midnight" from Sondheim's Into the Woods. The following year, representatives from their troop again placed first at the conference in the "Duet Musical" category with "Serious" from Legally Blonde the Musical.

Basic Academy offers a Marine Corps Junior Reserve Officers Training Corps (JROTC), which has competed nationally in armed and unarmed drill, physical fitness, and marksmanship.  The team won the National Championships at the United States Air Force Academy Invitational in Colorado Springs, Colorado from 1994 to 2003. Basic's MCJROTC Unarmed and Armed Drill Teams competed in the 2012 National Championships held in Torrance, California. They also went on to place in the Nationals held in 2013 in Torrance, California with the help of First Sergeant Samuel Rael USMC (Ret.).

Basic Academy also offers courses in performing arts such as band, orchestra, choir, and theatre.

Athletics

Basic Academy's athletics programs are known as the Wolves and compete in the Southeast Division of the Sunrise 4A Region.  The school's baseball and basketball programs won state championships in 1955, 1956 and in 1959. In 1959 Paul Hornyak, senior point guard, was the first High School All-American in basketball for the state of Nevada. The school's football program has won the Tri-State Championship in 1955. And the second in 1960 in Class 2A. A 3A championship was won by the girls' volleyball squad in 1975. The Basic Academy wrestling team placed second in State in 1971, 1972, 1973 and 1974, finally winning their first 3A Championship in 1975. The 2007 Basic men's varsity soccer team had its best season ever, going to the Regional tournament for the first time in over 29 years. The affiliate team the Southern Nevada Blue Sox won the American Legion World Series in 2017.

Nevada Interscholastic Activities Association State Championships
 Baseball – 1955, 1956, 1959, 1982, 1987, 2016, 2017, 2021, 2022
 Basketball – 1956, 1959, 1960
 Bowling (girls) – 2011, 2018
 Cross country (boys' and girls') – 1987, 1988, 1992, 1996, 1998, 2021
 Football – 1953, 1960
Golf (girls) - 2021
 Volleyball (boys) – 1998, 2002
 Volleyball (girls) – 1978
 Swimming - 1978
 Wrestling – 1975, 1979, 1984
 Robotics - 2017, 2018, 2019, 2020
Tennis (girls) - 2021
Tennis (boys) - 2021

In popular culture
The school's cheerleading squad was featured on a 2010 episode of Penn & Teller.

Notable alumni

 Ryne Nelson – professional baseball pitcher for the Arizona Diamondbacks 
 Scott Baker – former professional baseball pitcher
 Glen and Les Charles – television writers and producers, notably of Taxi and Cheers
 Chris Latham – former MLB player
 Harry Reid – former U.S. Senator from Nevada (1987-2017) and Senate Majority Leader (2007–2015)
 Henry Rolling – former NFL player
 Don Smerek – former NFL player
 Louis S. Warren – environmental author
 Dizzy Wright – rapper

Feeder schools
 Sister Robert Joseph Bailey Elementary School
 C. T. Sewell Elementary School
 John Dooley Elementary School
 Edna F. Hinman Elementary School
 Sue H. Morrow Elementary School
 Josh Stevens Elementary School
 Jim Thorpe Elementary School
 Harriet Treem Elementary School 
 B. Mahlon Brown Junior High School
 Francis H. Cortney Junior High School
 Lyal Burkholder Middle School
 Thurman White Middle School
 Legacy traditional schools cadence

References

External links
 Basic Academy of International Studies
 Clark County School District
 Basic Academy of International Studies - Facebook

Buildings and structures in Henderson, Nevada
Clark County School District
Education in Henderson, Nevada
Educational institutions established in 1942
High schools in Clark County, Nevada
School buildings completed in 1972
Public high schools in Nevada
1942 establishments in Nevada